Shahed Ali Patwary (Bengali শহীদ আলী পাটোয়ারী; 1899– 26 September 1958) was a lawyer and prominent politician. He was elected as member of East Pakistan Provincial Assembly.

Early life 
Patwary was born in 1899 in Aswinpur in Matlab Thana, Chandpur District, Bengal Presidency, British Raj. In 1921, he completed his bachelors in philosophy from Dhaka College. He did his Masters in Philosophy from the University of Dhaka in 1923. He completed a law degree and joined the Comilla District Bar in 1925 and 1926 respectively.

Career 
Patwary started his political career in 1929 when he joined the Krishak Praja Party then led by Sher-e-Bangla A.K. Fazlul Huq. In 1937, he was elected to the Bengal Legislative Assembly. He joined the revived Krishak Sramik Party in 1953. In 1954, he was elected to the East Bengal Provincial Assembly. In 1955, Patwary was elected as Deputy Speaker of East Bengal Provincial Assembly. He joined the Awami League in 1958.

Death 
On 23 September 1958, Patwary announced that an Awami League motion, petition by Dewan Mahbub Ali, declaring the speaker Abdul Hakeem to be of 'unsound mind' had been carried. This led to pandemonium in the East Pakistan Assembly which turned into a battlefield. The members fought and grappled with one another  and one of them hurled a paper weight which caught the poor deputy speaker Shahid ali in his head. He was injured and died two days later.

References

1899 births
1958 deaths
Bengali lawyers
Krishak Sramik Party politicians
People from Chandpur District
University of Dhaka alumni
Dhaka College alumni
20th-century Pakistani  lawyers
Awami League politicians